The SwissTech Convention Center is a conference centre on the campus of the École polytechnique fédérale de Lausanne (EPFL), Switzerland.

Building 

The building was designed by the architectural firm Richter Dahl Rocha & Associés of Lausanne. It was financed by two Credit Suisse real estate funds for 120 million Swiss francs. The Credit Suisse owns the building, while the EPFL pays an annual rent of 6 million Swiss francs. This public-private partnership was criticised by the Swiss Federal Audit Office as "the conditions are unfavourable to the EPFL and favourable to the investor".

Financial support from the Swiss electricity supply company Romande énergie allowed the west facade of the building to be covered with panels made of organic dye-sensitized solar cell, also called "Grätzel cells" after Michael Grätzel, a physical chemistry professor at the EPFL and the inventor of this technology.

Events

Regular 
 Magistrale (EPFL graduation ceremonies)
 Planète Santé
 Forum EPFL
 PolyLAN
 The Brain Forum
 Applied Machine Learning Days

Other 
 13 November 2015: The Moon Race
 European Space Agency - EUCLID
 Sport Accord Convention 2016
 11 July 2017: meeting of the International Olympic Committee about the 2024 Summer Olympics, with delegations including Emmanuel Macron
 24 January 2018: draw for the 2018-19 UEFA Nations League
 June 2019: The 134th IOC Session

See also 
Lausanne campus

References

External links 

 Brochure
 Flickr

École Polytechnique Fédérale de Lausanne
Convention centres in Switzerland